The 1920–21 season saw Rochdale compete in The F.A. Cup for the 9th time where they were knocked out in the first round proper. It was also the club's final season in the Central League before election to the Third Division North.

Statistics

|}

Competitions

Central League

F.A. Cup

Manchester Senior Cup

Lancashire Junior Cup

Friendlies

References

Rochdale A.F.C. seasons
Rochdale